Rossleigh Court, constructed between 1906 and 1907, currently is a rental apartment building located on the northwest corner of 85th Street and Central Park West in the Upper West Side of Manhattan in New York City.

Like the similarly designed and adjoining building to its north, 257 Central Park West, Rossleigh Court was designed by Mulliken and Moeller and built by Gotham Building and Construction. Opening one year after its "twin" to the north, both buildings followed the popular "French Flat" model in a Beaux-Arts style.

References

External links 
 251 Central Park West in Google Maps
 Central Park West Historic District, National Register of Historic Places Nomination Form, New York State Historic Preservation Office.
 New York City Landmarks Preservation Commission Upper West Side-Central Park West Historic District Designation Report. Vol I
 New York City Landmarks Preservation Commission Upper West Side-Central Park West Historic District Designation Report. Vol II
 New York City Landmarks Preservation Commission Upper West Side-Central Park West Historic District Designation Report. Vol III
 Rossleigh Court from the Southeast in 1908
 Original Floor Plan for Rossleigh Court

1907 establishments in New York City
Central Park West Historic District
Historic district contributing properties in Manhattan
Residential buildings in Manhattan
Residential buildings completed in 1907
Upper West Side